Cipriano Branco or Branco (born December 25, 1980) is an East Timorese football player who currently play for Karketu Dili in Liga Futebol Amadora. He is the current midfielder for the Timor-Leste national football team. His international debut against the Philippine team on October 20, 2010 in 2010 AFF Suzuki Cup qualification as a substitute in the 52nd minute.

References

Living people
East Timorese footballers
Association football midfielders
Timor-Leste international footballers
1980 births